The 1949 NCAA Men's Ice Hockey Tournament was the culmination of the 1948–49 NCAA men's ice hockey season, the 2nd such tournament in NCAA history. It was held between March 17 and 19, 1949, and concluded with Boston College defeating Dartmouth 4-3. All games were played at the Broadmoor Ice Palace in Colorado Springs, Colorado.

This is the first time that a consolation game was played in an NCAA tournament. The practice would continue unabated until it was abolished after the 1989 tournament.

All four teams selected for the tournament had played in the championship the previous season. This has only occurred one other time, in 1975, counting either all tournament entries or only the final four teams. (as of 2016)

Qualifying teams
Four teams qualified for the tournament, two each from the eastern and western regions. The teams were selected by a committee based upon both their overall record and the strength of their opponents.

Format
The eastern and western teams judged as better were seeded as the top regional teams. The second eastern seed was slotted to play the top western seed and vice versa. All games were played at the Broadmoor Ice Palace. All matches were Single-game eliminations with the semifinal winners advancing to the national championship game and the losers playing in a consolation game.

Bracket

Note: * denotes overtime period(s)

Results

Semifinals

Michigan vs. Dartmouth

Boston College vs. Colorado College

Consolation Game

Michigan vs. Colorado College

Championship Game

(E1) Boston College vs. (E2) Dartmouth

All-Tournament team

First Team
G: Dick Desmond* (Dartmouth)
D: Ed Songin (Boston College)
D: Mike Thayer (Dartmouth)
F: Wally Grant (Michigan)
F: Jack Mulhern (Boston College)
F: Joe Riley (Dartmouth)
* Most Outstanding Player(s)

Second Team
G: Bernie Burke (Boston College)
D: Ron Newson (Colorado College)
D: Lew Meier (Colorado College)
F: Bill Riley (Dartmouth)
F: Wally Gacek (Michigan)
F: Connie Hill (Michigan)

References

Tournament
NCAA Division I men's ice hockey tournament
NCAA Men's Ice Hockey Tournament
NCAA Men's Ice Hockey Tournament
1940s in Colorado Springs, Colorado
Ice hockey competitions in Colorado Springs, Colorado